Lewis Maxwell (April 17, 1790 – February 13, 1862) was a U.S. Representative from Virginia.

Biography
Born in Chester County, Pennsylvania, Maxwell moved with his mother to Virginia about 1800.
He completed a preparatory course.
He studied law.
He was admitted to the bar and commenced practice in Weston, Virginia (now West Virginia).
He served as member of the State house of delegates in 1821–1824.

Maxwell was elected as an Adams candidate to the 20th U.S. Congress (1827-1829).
He was reelected as an Anti-Jacksonian to the 21st and 22nd U.S. Congresses (1827–1833).
He served as chairman of the Committee on Expenditures in the Department of War (Twenty-first Congress), Committee on Expenditures in the Department of the Navy (Twenty-second Congress).
He was not a candidate for re-nomination in 1832.
He resumed the practice of law and was also engaged as a surveyor and land patentee.
He died in West Union, Virginia (now West Virginia), February 13, 1862.
He was interred in Odd Fellows Cemetery.

Sources

1790 births
1862 deaths
Members of the Virginia House of Delegates
Virginia lawyers
19th-century American politicians
People from Chester County, Pennsylvania
People from Weston, West Virginia
People from West Union, West Virginia
National Republican Party members of the United States House of Representatives from Virginia
Maxwell family of West Virginia